Kaszów  is a village in the administrative district of Gmina Liszki, within Kraków County, Lesser Poland Voivodeship, in southern Poland.

The village has a population of 2,030.

During the Second World War 27 Polish civilians (including 7 women) were tortured and murdered on July 1, 1943, in Kaszów by troops of German Police and SS. 24 households were burned.

References

Villages in Kraków County